Augustin (Agustin) de Betancourt may refer to:

 Agustín de Vetancurt (1620–1700), Mexican Catholic historian and scholar of the Nahuatl language
 Agustín de Betancourt (1758–1825), Spanish engineer